Manem, or Jeti (Yeti), is a Papuan language of Sandaun Province, Papua New Guinea, and Indonesian Papua.

In Indonesia, it is spoken in Wembi, Mannem District, Keerom Regency.

References

Border languages (New Guinea)
Languages of western New Guinea
Languages of Sandaun Province